Adolf Althoff (25 June 1913 in Sonsbeck – 14 October 1998 in Stolberg (Rhineland) was a German circus owner, animal tamer and performer who saved several people from the Holocaust by having them work and travel in his circus. A member of a 300-year-old circus family, Althoff and his story are featured in a book about Germans who saved Jews from the Holocaust (Other Germans Under Hitler by Herbert Straeten). The events of his rescue during World War II are also dramatized in a 1998 Showtime TV-movie entitled Rescuers: Stories of Courage: Two Families.

Althoff warned the people he rescued with the code Go Fishing. In 1995 he and his wife Maria were named Righteous Among the Nations, an Israeli honor.

He was born into the family in Sonsbeck, Germany. At age 17 he became publicity director for his families of the circus. In his twenties Althoff and his sister formed their own circus, of which he was the ringmaster for 30 years. In 1940, Althoff began five years work in concealing four members of the Danner performing family in his circus. Althoff provided the Danners with false identity papers and had the family working under pseudonyms.

References

External links
 Adolf Althoff at Yad Vashem website

1913 births
1998 deaths
Ringmasters
German Righteous Among the Nations
Recipients of the Cross of the Order of Merit of the Federal Republic of Germany
Members of the Order of Merit of North Rhine-Westphalia